Hugues is a masculine given name most often found in francophone countries, a variant of the originally Germanic name "Hugo" or " Hugh". The final s marks the nominative case in Old French, but is not retained by modern pronunciation (such as in English: Charles, Giles, James, etc.). The old oblique case Hugon (Huon, Yon) disappeared.

Notable people bearing this name include:
 Crusader kings of Cyprus:
 Hugues I de Lusignan (1194/1195–1218) 
 Hugues II de Lusignan (1252/1253–1267)
 Hugues, Bishop of Dié, (c. 1040–1106)
 Hugues Absil (born 1961), French painter
 Hugues Aubriot (13??-1382/1391), French administrator and heretic 
 Hugues Aufray (born 1929), French singer 
 Hugues Le Bars (1950–2014), French film music composer
 Hugues IV de Berzé (1150/1155–1220), French knight, crusader and poet
 Hugues Bousiges (born 1948), French civil servant
 Hugues Briatte (born 1990), French rugby union player
 Hugues Broussard (born 1934), French Olympic swimmer
 Hugues Capet (c.939–996), first King of the Franks  
 Hugues Cosnier (????-1629), French engineer 
 Hugues de Châteauneuf (1053–1132), French Bishop, theologian and Catholic saint 
 Hugues Cuénod (1902–2010), Swiss singer opera and musical stage singer
 Hugues-Wilfried Dah (born 1986), Burkinabé footballer 
 Hugues Delorme (1868-1942), French poet, comedian, playwright and journalist
 Hugues Doneau (1527–1591), French law professor 
 Hugues Duboscq (born 1981), French Olympic breaststroke swimmer
 Hugues Dufourt (born 1943), French composer and philosopher
 Hugues Fournel (born 1988), Canadian Olympic canoeist
 Hugues le Grand (898–956), Duke of the Franks and Count of Paris
 Hugues Heney (1789–1844), Canadian lawyer and politician
 Hugues Krafft (1853–1935), French photographer 
 Hugues Felicité Robert de Lamennais (1782-1854), French priest, philosopher and political theorist
 Hugues Lapointe (1911– 1982), Canadian politician and lawyer
 Hugues Legault (born 1974), Canadian swimmer
 Hugues de Lionne (1611–1671), French statesman
 Hugues Loubenx de Verdalle (1531–1595), French-born 52nd Grand Master of the Order of Malta 
 Hugues-Bernard Maret, Duc de Bassano, (1763–1839), French statesman and journalist
 Hugues Obry (born 1973), French fencer and Olympic medalist
 Hugues Occansey (born 1966), French basketball player
 Hugues de Pairaud (12??-13??), French leader of the Knights Templar 
 Hugues Panassié (1912–1974), French jazz critic and producer
 Hugues de Payens (c.1070–1136), French co-founder of the Knights Templar
 Hugues C. Pernath (1931-1975), Belgian writer
 Hugues de Pierrepont (????-1229), French Bishop of Liège
 Hugues Claude Pissarro (born 1935), French painter
 Hugues Portelli (born 1947), French politician 
 Hugues Randin (1628–c.1680), French-born Canadian engineer
 Hugues Rebell (1867-1905), French author  
 Hugues de Poitiers, (????-1187), French Benedictine monk
 Hugues de Romans (c. 1040–1106), French papal legate and Archbishop of Lyon
 Hugues de Roussan (born 1955), Canadian handball player and Olympic competitor 
 Hugues de Saint-Cher (ca. 1200–1263), French Dominican friar and cardinal and theologian
 Hugues Sambin (ca. 1520–1601), French sculptor
 Hugues Sweeney (born ???), Canadian artist and web designer
 Hugues Taraval (1729-1785), French painter
 Hugues Tshiyinga Mafo (born 1983), Democratic Republic of Congo sprinter
 Hugues Wembangomo (born 1992), Democratic Republic of Congo-born Norwegian footballer 
 Hugues Zagbayou (born 1990), Ivorian football player 

Masculine given names
French masculine given names